Jonathan Wallace (born 1986) is an American basketball player.

Jonathan Wallace may also refer to:
Jonathan Wallace (Georgia politician) (elected 2017), member of Georgia General Assembly, United States
Jonathan H. Wallace (1824-1892), United States congressman from Ohio
Jon Magrin, Maltese/Jamaican rugby league player, formerly Jonathan Wallace

See also
Jonathan Wallace House, historic house in New York, United States